Saturnin Zawadzki (7 July 1923 in Radom, Poland – 17 September 2003) was a Polish soil scientist. Professor of The Institute for Land Reclamation and Grassland Farming and member of the Institute of Agrophysics, Polish Academy of Sciences (PAN).

Author of works about origins, evolution and transforms of hydrogenic soils. Author of books Zarys charakterystyki gleb Polski, Gleboznawstwo.

References

External links
 

1923 births
2003 deaths
People from Radom
Polish soil scientists
Members of the Polish Academy of Sciences